Morcon may refer to:

Morcón, a type of chorizo in Spanish cuisine
Morcón (Filipino cuisine), a type of beef roulade in Filipino cuisine
Prosafe, an owner/operator of semi-submersible accommodation and service rigs, which was originally known as Morcon